SLVR or Slvr may refer to:

 Viru Viru International Airport (ICAO code SLVR), Santa Cruz de la Sierra, Bolivia
 Motorola Slvr phone